Nat Geo Kids Abu Dhabi was an Emirati free-to-air Arabic language documentary channel for children, owned by National Geographic Society/The Walt Disney Company EMEA (Disney International Content and Operations) and the Abu Dhabi Media Foundation. Launched on 20 November 2017, the channel was freely available through Nilesat. The channel also dealt with scientific, geographic and natural science documentaries.

Shutdown
The channel was shut down on 1 January 2020, with a short notice in Arabic that was published on the channel's website. The text reads as follows:

Although the channel is shut down, its official and social media sites remained active online but shortly later, its social media sites were removed and the official website went down.

See also
 National Geographic Kids

References

External links
 Official Website
 Video about "National Geographic Kids Abu Dhabi" on YouTube

Dubai
Television channels and stations established in 2017
Television channels and stations disestablished in 2020
Non-profit organisations based in Abu Dhabi
Companies based in Abu Dhabi
Entertainment companies of the United Arab Emirates
Television production companies of the United Arab Emirates
Mass media in Abu Dhabi
2017 establishments in the United Arab Emirates
2020 disestablishments in the United Arab Emirates